Alfredo Kangleon Bantug, Sr. (July 31, 1909 – May 20, 1996) was a Filipino politician who was the first governor of Southern Leyte.

Bantug attended Maasin Institute (MI, now the College of Maasin) where he later worked as a teacher. He would become Mayor of Maasin in 1944. He would fight for in World War II as guerilla and would be known for establishing a provincial federation of retirees. He was also a labor union leader.

He would be appointed as the first governor of the then-newly founded province of Southern Leyte in 1960, which ended his tenure as Mayor which was supposedly to last until 1963. He would be elected as governor of Southern Leyte in 1967 and serve as executive head of the province until 1967, after he lost the gubernatorial election against Salvacion Yniguez. He would serve as barangay captain of Tagnipa prior to his retirement from politics.

The provincial office of the Philippine National Police would be posthumously named after Bantug.

References

1909 births
1996 deaths
Governors of Southern Leyte
Mayors of places in Southern Leyte